The 1950 Australian Grand Prix was a motor race held at the Nuriootpa Road Circuit in South Australia on 2 January 1950. It was organised by the Sporting Car Club of South Australia, promoted by the Barossa Valley Vintage Festival Association and staged over 34 laps of the 4.8-kilometre circuit for a race distance of 163 kilometres. The race, which is recognized by the Confederation of Australian Motor Sport as the fifteenth Australian Grand Prix, was a Formula Libre race.

The race utilised a handicap start with cars commencing progressively, slowest through to fastest, at timed intervals. The declared winner of the Grand Prix however, was the driver with the fastest elapsed race time, regardless of handicap. All other official awards were based on the handicap results, with an additional trophy awarded to the handicap winner and prize money paid for the first nine handicap places. Doug Whiteford, driving a Ford V8 Special, known as 'Black Bess', won his first Australian Grand Prix, completing the race distance almost three minutes faster than Rupert Steele, driving an Alfa Romeo. Jim Gullan, driving an Oldsmobile-powered Ballot Special recorded the third fastest race time and was also the official handicap winner.

Classification 

The above results rank all finishers based on actual race time, regardless of handicap. Officially, race results were based on handicap placings, with the exception of the actual Australian Grand Prix title itself, which was awarded to the driver setting the fastest race time.

It is not known if the cars of McKenna and Douglas actually retired from the race or were still running when the race time expired.

Notes 
 Attendance: 35,000 (police estimate)
 Number of starters: 29
 Fastest lap: Rupert Steele and Doug Whiteford – 2'27 (73.47 mph, 118.2 km/h)

References

Further reading
 The official history of the Australian Grand Prix - 80 Races, Chevron Publishing Group, 2014

External links
 1950 Australian Grand Prix, Motor Sport, November 1949, page 476, www.motorsportmagazine.com 
 Post 1950 race results from www.dlg.speedfreaks.org
 1950 Australian Grand Prix: Nuriootpa, South Australia…, primotipo.com
 The Nuriootpa circuit at www.tasman-series.com via web.archive.org

Grand Prix
Australian Grand Prix
Motorsport in South Australia
Australian Grand Prix